The Italian Nusach is the ancient prayer rite (nusach) of the indigenous Jews on the Italian peninsula who are not of Ashkenazi or Sephardic origin.

History 
The Italian nusach has been considered an offspring of the ancient Palestinian minhag and it has similarities with the nusach of the Romaniote Jews of Greece and the Balkans. However, the documents discovered in Cairo Geniza reveal that the influence of Minhag Eretz Israel on Benè Romì is less extensive than believed.

Unique features of the Nusach
 On Friday nights, the Maariv Aravim and Emet VeEmunah blessings are recited using a special text for the Sabbath.
 Psalm 20 is not recited in between Ashrei and Uva letzion.  Instead, it is recited as part of long Tachanun.
 On weekdays, the Torah is returned in between Ashrei and Uva letzion.
 Aleinu is never recited at Mincha.
 The words 'le'eila le'eila' are recited in every Kaddish.
 Kol Nidrei (Kol Nedarim) is recited in Hebrew, rather than in Aramaic.
 The 'Ve-hasieinu' prayer is recited in the prayers of Rosh Hashanah.
 Kedushah opens in all prayers (including Shacharit and Mincha) with the "Keter" form.

See also 
 Italian Jews

Notes

References

External links 

 Scan of the 1485 edition of the Italian Machzor from the website of the National Library of Israel
 Scan of the 1540 Kimha De-avishuna Machzor from the website of the National Library of Israel
 Machzor Shadal 1856 from the website of the National Library of Israel
 Siddur Bnei Romi 
 Siddurim and Machzorim of the Italian synagogue in Jerusalem
 "Aspetti peculiari del minhàg italiano"  by Rabbi Alberto Somekh
 The Italian-Jewish Liturgy
 The Italian Rite

Nusachs
Italian Jews
Italian-Jewish diaspora
Italki Jews topics